Human rights in Libya is the record of human rights upheld and violated in various stages of Libya's history. The Kingdom of Libya, from 1951 to 1969, was heavily influenced and educated by the British and Y.R.K companies.  Under the King, Libya had a constitution. The kingdom, however, was marked by a feudal regime, where Libya had a low literacy rate of 10%, a low life expectancy of 57 years, and 40% of the population lived in shanties, tents, or caves. Illiteracy and homelessness were chronic problems during this era, when iron shacks dotted many urban centres on the country.

From 1969 to 2011, the history of Libya was marked by the Libyan Arab Jamahiriya (where jamahiriya means "state of the masses"), a  "direct democracy" political system established by Muammar Gaddafi, who nominally stepped down from power in 1977, but remained an unofficial "Brother Leader" until 2011. Under the Jamahiriya, Libya maintained a relatively high quality of life due to its nationalized oil wealth and small population, coupled with government policies that undid the social injustices of the Senussi era. The country's literacy rate rose to 90%, and welfare systems were introduced that allowed access to free education, free healthcare, and financial assistance for housing. In 2008, the General People's Congress had declared the Great Green Charter of Human Rights of the Jamahiriyan Era. The Great Manmade River was also built to allow free access to fresh water across large parts of the country. In addition, illiteracy and homelessness had been "almost wiped out," and financial support was provided for university scholarships and employment programs, while the nation as a whole remained debt-free. As a result, Libya's Human Development Index in 2010 was the highest in Africa and greater than that of Saudi Arabia.

Throughout Gaddafi's rule, international non-governmental organizations routinely characterized Libya's human rights situation as poor, citing systematic abuses such as political repression, restrictions on political freedoms and civil liberties, and arbitrary imprisonment; the American government funded Freedom House's annual Freedom in the World report consistently gave it a ranking of "Not Free" and gave Libya their lowest possible rating of "7" in their evaluations of civil liberties and political freedoms from 1989 to 2010. Gaddafi also publicly bragged about sending hit squads to assassinate exiled dissidents, and Libyan state media openly announced bounties on the heads of political opponents. The Gaddafi regime was also accused of the 1996 Abu Salim prison massacre. In 2010, Amnesty International, published a critical report on Libya, raising concerns about cases of enforced disappearances and other human rights violations that remained unresolved, and that Internal Security Agency members implicated in those violations continued to operate with impunity. In January 2011, the United Nations Human Rights Council published a report analysing the Libyan Arab Jamahiriya's human rights record with input from member nations, most of which (including many European and most Asian, African and South American nations) generally praised the country's progressive efforts in human rights, though some (particularly Australia, France, Israel, Switzerland, and the United States) raised concerns about human rights abuses concerning cases of disappearance and torture, and restrictions on free press and free association; Libya agreed to investigate cases involving disappearance and torture, and to repeal any laws criminalizing political expression or restricting a free independent press, and affirmed that it had an independent judiciary.

Libya under Gaddafi

Revolutionary Committees
In the early 1970s, Gaddafi created the Revolutionary Committees as conduits for raising political consciousness, with the aim of direct political participation by all Libyans. In 1979, however, some of these committees had eventually evolved into self-appointed, sometimes zealous, enforcers of revolutionary orthodoxy. During the early 1980s, these committees had considerable power and became a growing source of tension within the Jamahiriya, to the extent that Gaddafi sometimes criticized their effectiveness and excessive repression, until the power of the Revolutionary Committees was eventually restricted in the late 1980s.

The Revolutionary Committees had been resembling similar systems in totalitarian countries; reportedly, 10 to 20 percent of Libyans worked in surveillance for these committees, with surveillance taking place in government, in factories, and in the education sector. They also posted bounties for the killing of Libyan critics charged with treason abroad. Opposition activists were occasionally executed publicly and the executions were rebroadcast on public television channels.

In 1988, Gaddafi criticized the excessive measures taken by the Revolutionary Councils, stating that "they deviated, harmed, tortured" and that "the true revolutionary does not practise repression." That same year, the Libyan Arab Jamahiriya issued the Great Green Document on Human Rights, in which Article 5 established laws that allowed greater freedom of expression. Article 8 of The Code on the Promotion of 
Freedom stated that "each citizen has the right to express his opinions and ideas openly in People’s Congresses and in all mass media." A number of restrictions were also placed on the power of the Revolutionary Committees, leading to a resurgence in the Libyan state's popularity by the early 1990s. In 2004, however, Libya posted a $1 million bounty for journalist Ashur Shamis, under the allegation that he was linked to Al-Qaeda and terror suspect Abu Qatada.

Foreign languages and migrant workers
Until 1998, foreign languages were not part of the school curriculum. One protester in 2011 described the situation as: "None of us can speak English or French. He kept us ignorant and blindfolded". The US State Department claimed that ethnic, Islamic fundamentalist and tribal minorities suffer discrimination, and that the state continues to restrict the labour rights of foreign workers. In 1998, CERD expressed concern about alleged "acts of discrimination against migrant workers on the basis of their national or ethnic origin", which the United Nations Human Rights Council also expressed concern about in 2010. Human Rights Watch in September 2006 documented how migrant workers and other foreigners were subjected to human rights abuses, which have increased drastically against black Africans under the National Transitional Council following the Libyan Civil War.

Criticism of allegations
The Libyan Arab Jamahiriya rejected the allegations against the country. They pointed to how their country is founded on direct people's democracy that guaranteed direct exercise of authority by all citizens through the people's congresses. Citizens were able to express opinions of the congresses on issues related to political, economic, social, and cultural issues. In addition, there were information platforms such as newspapers and TV channels for people to express their opinions through. Libyan authorities also argued that no one in the Libyan Arab Jamahiriya suffered from extreme poverty and hunger, and that the government guaranteed a minimum of food and essential needs to people with low incomes. In 2006, an initiative was adopted for providing people with low incomes investment portfolios amounting to $30,000 to be deposited with banks and companies.

HIV trial

The HIV trial in Libya (or Bulgarian nurses affair) concerns the trials, appeals and eventual release of six foreign medical workers charged with conspiring to deliberately infect over 400 children with HIV-tainted blood in 1998, causing an epidemic at El-Fatih Children's Hospital in Benghazi.
On 6 May 2004, a Libyan court sentenced the workers to death. They were eventually remanded to Bulgarian custody in 2007, and subsequently pardoned. The Libyan government filed complaints about the matter with the Arab League before the government's overthrow in 2011.

Abu Salim prison massacre

In 2006, Amnesty International called for an independent inquiry into unconfirmed deaths that occurred in Abu Salim maximum security prison during the 1996 riot. In 2009, Human Rights Watch believes that 1,270 prisoners were killed. However, Human Rights Watch states that they were unable to independently verify the allegations. The claims cited by Human Rights Watch are based on the testimony of a single former inmate, Hussein Al Shafa’i, who stated that he did not witness a prisoner being killed: "I could not see the dead prisoners who were shot..."

The figure of 1200 killed was arrived at by Al Shafa’i allegedly calculating the number of meals he prepared when he was working in the prison's kitchen. At the same time, Al Shafa'i stated "I was asked by the prison guards to wash the watches that were taken from the bodies of the dead prisoners..." Al Shafa’i lives in the United States, where he applied for asylum, Hussein al-Shafa'i said he entered Abu Salim from 1988 to 2000 on political charges.

The Libyan Government rejected the allegations about Abu Salim. In May 2005, the Internal Security Agency head of the Great Socialist People's Libyan Arab Jamahiriya told Human Rights Watch that the prisoners captured some guards and stole weapons from the prison cache. The prisoners and guards died as security personnel tried to restore order, and the government opened an investigation on the order of the Minister of Justice. The Libyan official stated that more than 400 prisoners escaped Abu Salim in four separate break-outs prior to and after the incident: in July 1995, December 1995, June 1996 and July 2001. Among the escapees were men who then fought with Islamist militant groups in Afghanistan, Iran, and Iraq.

In 2009, the Libyan government stated that the killings took place amid confrontation between the government and rebels from the Libyan Islamic Fighting Group, and that some 200 guards were killed as well. In August 2009, several were granted amnesty by the government. Those released included 45 members of the Libyan Islamic Fighting Group (LIFG), most of whom had been in prison since the mid-1990s after being sentenced in unfair trials for an attempt to overthrow then-jamahiriya leader Muammar Gaddafi. The releases came after the group renounced violence in August 2009. Authorities at Abu Salim prison also released 43 "members of other jihadist groups," a press release said.

In January 2011, the Libyan Arab Jamahiriya confirmed that it was carrying out an investigation into the incident along with international investigators.

The Libyan insurgents claimed that 1270 people were buried at a supposed mass grave they discovered. However, investigators from CNN and other organizations found only what appeared to be animal bones at the site.

Torture
In January 2011, the Libyan Arab Jamahiriya stated that the practice of torture and ill treatment was forbidden in article 434 of the Penal Code, which stated that public officials who had ordered the torture of a person or had committed an act of torture were sentenced to 3 to 10 years' imprisonment. Gaddafi openly condemned the use of torture, as a criticism against several Revolutionary Committees that had condoned the use of torture.

Torture was allegedly used by Libya's security forces to punish rebels after the rebellion hit north west Libya during the civil war. Torture has been used by rebel forces, who established unofficial detention facilities equipped with torture devices such as ropes, sticks and rubber hoses. The rebels have used torture against many suspected Gaddafi supporters, targeting black Africans in particular.

Civil war

Various states and supranational bodies have condemned the use of military and mercenaries against Libyan civilians during the Libyan Civil War, an allegation that Saif al-Islam Gaddafi denies.

After an emergency meeting on 22 February, the Arab League suspended Libya from taking part in council meetings and Moussa issued a statement condemning the "crimes against the current peaceful popular protests and demonstrations in several Libyan cities." Libya was suspended from the UN Human Rights Council by United Nations General Assembly Resolution 65/265, which was adopted by consensus and cited the Gaddafi government's use of violence against protesters. A number of governments, including Britain, Canada, Switzerland, the United States, Germany and Australia took action to freeze assets of Gaddafi and his associates. The move was criticised as double-standard as numerous similar human right abuses in Bahrain, Yemen or elsewhere produced no action at all.

Luis Moreno Ocampo, chief prosecutor of the International Criminal Court, estimated that between 500 and 700 people were killed by Gaddafi's security forces in February 2011, before the rebels even took up arms. "Shooting at protestors was systematic," Moreno-Ocampo stated, discussing the Libyan government's response to the initial pro-democracy demonstrations.

Moreno-Ocampo further stated that during the ongoing civil war, "War crimes are apparently committed as a matter of policy" by forces loyal to Gaddafi.
This is further supported by claims of Human Rights Watch, that 10 protesters, who had already agreed to lay down arms, were executed by a government paramilitary group in Bani Walid in May.

On 26 February 2011, the United Nations Security Council voted unanimously in a resolution to impose strict sanctions, including targeted travel bans, against Gaddafi's government, as well as to refer Gaddafi and other members of his regime to the International Criminal Court for investigation into allegations of brutality against civilians, which could constitute crimes against humanity in violation of international law. There are many reports of these sanctions being broken where support against Libyan government forces is the case.

Rebel forces have been criticized for a number of human rights violations, including indiscriminate bombardment of heavily populated cities, torture and killing of prisoners of war, and racist lynchings of black people.

In June 2011, a detailed investigation carried out by Amnesty International claimed that many of the allegations against Gaddafi and the Libyan state turned out to either be false or lack any credible evidence, noting that rebels at times appeared to have knowingly made false claims or manufactured evidence. According to the Amnesty investigation, the number of casualties was heavily exaggerated, some of the protesters may have been armed, "there is no proof of mass killing of civilians on the scale of Syria or Yemen," and there is no evidence that aircraft or heavy anti-aircraft machine guns were used against crowds. It also doubted claims from the Western media that the protest movement was "entirely peaceful" and "presented no security challenge."

However, in a later report from Amnesty International it was found that "al-Gaddafi forces committed serious violations of international humanitarian law (IHL), including war crimes, and gross human rights violations,which point to the commission of crimes against humanity. They deliberately killed and injured scores of unarmed protesters; subjected perceived opponents and critics to enforced disappearance and torture and other ill- treatment; and arbitrarily detained scores of civilians. They launched indiscriminate attacks and attacks targeting civilians in their efforts to regain control of Misratah and territory in the east. They launched artillery, mortar and rocket attacks against residential areas. They used inherently indiscriminate weapons such as anti-personnel land mines and cluster bombs, including in residential areas."

In July 2011, Saif al-Islam Gaddafi had an interview with Russia Today, where he denied the ICC's allegations that he or his father Muammar Gaddafi ordered the killing of civilian protesters. He pointed out that he is not a member of the government or the military, and therefore has no authority to give such orders. According to Saif, he made recorded calls to General Abdul Fatah Younis, who later defected to the rebel forces, in order to request not to use force against protesters, to which Fatah responded that they are attacking a military site, where surprised guards fired in self-defense.

In August 2011, Physicians for Human Rights released a report documenting severe violations of human rights and evidence of war crimes and possible crimes against humanity in Misrata. In December 2011, PHR released another report documenting evidence of a massacre at a warehouse in Tripoli in which soldiers of Khamis Qaddafi’s 32nd Brigade unlawfully detained, raped, tortured and executed at least 53 detainees. PHR’s medico-legal investigation and resulting report provided the first comprehensive account of the 32nd Brigade massacre, and provided forensic evidence needed to secure accountability for crimes according to international legal standards.

In January 2012, independent human rights groups published a report describing the human rights violations committed by all sides, including NATO, anti-Gaddafi forces, and pro-Gaddafi forces. The same report also accused NATO of war crimes. During and after the war, the National Transitional Council implemented a new Law 37, restricting freedom of speech, where any praise of glorification of Gaddafi or the previous government is punishable with imprisonment, with sentences ranging from three to fifteen years. The law was eventually revoked in June 2012.

According to Human Rights Watch annual report 2016, journalists are still being targeted by the armed groups in Libya. One of the victims was Muftah Al-Qatrani, who worked for media production company, he was killed in Benghazi in April 2015. In other case, the fate of two Tunisian journalist, Sofiane Chourabi and Nadhir Ktari, is still unknown since September 2014. Later, in April 2015, Groups affiliated with ISIS claimed the responsibility of killing them. In November 2015, the NGO Reporters Without Borders (RSF) claimed that journalists in Libya were targeted in 31 incidents during 2015. The organization added that Libya has very low rank in the 2015 press freedom index as it occupied 154 out of 180 countries.

August 2016, Euro-Mediterranean Human Rights Monitor warned from the illicit spreading of weapons among Libyan population. According to the monitor, dozens of loosely formed, armed groups have formed, which makes a "chaos of weapons". The spreading of weapons represents a major obstacle to the reconstruction of Libya. It is also paves the way to murder, drug, arm trafficking and kidnapping. The monitor calls central authorities in Libya to act urgently, with the UN support to put an end to this chaos.

December 2016, Euro-Mediterranean Human Rights Monitor issued a report regarding the violation of human rights in Libya. According to the report, since July 2014, Ganfoda has been besieged by Khalifa Haftar’s Libyan National Army forces; the civilian has suffered long-month power cut, resulting in shortage of food, water, and medicine. As the civilians have been prevented from access to food and medical aid, more than 170 families were evacuated, yet the children are being used as bait by the Libyan army forces in order to prevent their families fleeing away to use them as a part of their militant operations. They are, therefore, at risk of detention and prolonged investigation, in case of attempting to cross the checkpoints. It also showed ambulance crews cannot enter the town due to ground and air attacks; and the Libyan Red Crescent Society cannot provide any humanitarian relief for the people.

On September 21, 2020, the European Union Council imposed sanctions on three companies and two people, which were responsible for human rights abuses in Libya and violated the UN arms embargo. The sanctions consisted of asset freeze and a travel ban for persons, and asset freeze for the companies.

On 25 July 2022, Martha Ama Akyaa Pobee, UN Assistant Secretary-General for political affairs and peace operations stated that the overall situation in Libya remains “highly volatile”, while clashes in and around Tripoli surged. Frustrated Libyans demonstrated over the lack of progress on elections and poor State services, prolonging tensions and fuelling insecurity.

Women's rights
As in many modern revolutions, women played a major role in the 2011 Libyan Revolution. After the revolution, concerns were raised by human rights groups about attempts to sideline women in Libya's political and economic environments as well as a lack of strong protections for women's rights in the new constitution.

GNC opponents argue that it supported Islamist actions against women. Sadiq Ghariani, the Grand Mufti of Libya, is perceived to be linked closely to Islamist parties. He has issued fatwas ordering Muslims to obey the GNC, and fatwas ordering Muslims to fight against Haftar's forces.

Later in 2013, lawyer Hamida al-Hadi al-Asfar, advocate of women's rights, was abducted, tortured and killed. It is alleged she was targeted for criticising the Grand Mufti's declaration. No arrests were made.

In June 2013, two politicians, Ali Tekbali and Fathi Sager, appeared in court for "insulting Islam" for publishing a cartoon promoting women's rights. Under sharia law they were facing a possible death penalty. The case caused widespread concern although they were eventually acquitted in March 2014. The GNC yielded to pressure for organising new elections, voting 124 out of 133 in favour of a new Electoral Law on 30 March 2014. In the 25 June 2014 elections, Ali Tekbali was elected to the new House of Representatives in the seat of Tripoli Central, with 4777 votes. Out of 200 seats, Article 16 of the Electoral Laws reserved 30 seats for women.

During Nouri Abusahmain's presidency of the GNC and subsequent to GNC's decision to enforce sharia law in December 2013, gender segregation and compulsory hijab were being imposed in Libyan universities from early 2014, provoking strong criticism from women's rights groups.

On 15 July 2020, Amnesty International urged the Libyan National Army to reveal the whereabouts of Siham Sergiwa, a Libyan politician and women’s rights defender who was violently abducted from her home a year ago.

Libyan coastguard's violation of migrants' rights 
The Euro-Med Human Rights Monitor published a report condemning the Libyan coastguard officers' whipping of a group of migrants rescued near Libya’s Sabratha. In September 2014, nearly 450 migrants were drowned in the Mediterranean. In 2016, more than 4,578 migrants drowned there, following an agreement between the EU and Turkey and the closure of the Balkan route. According to the report, the migrants smuggled into Libya are subject to human trafficking, torture, forced labor, sexual exploitation, and arbitrary detention through their way. The Libyan forces were caught on video while humiliating migrants, including women and children. Besides, Human Rights Watch documented similar cases in which Libyan coastguard forces assaulted them verbally and physically in July 2016.

According to the UNHCR figures, as of March 2019, 879 people have been rescued at sea by the Libyan Coast Guard in 10 operations in 2019. Around 6,000 migrants and asylum seekers are being held in Libyan detention centers. More than 3,000 are at a risk of getting involved in the fight over Tripoli.

As per the report published by Amnesty International, migrants in Libya’s detention camp faced unabated human rights violations during the first six months of 2021. Diana Eltahawy, Amnesty’s Middle East and North Africa director was quoted as saying “The report also highlights the ongoing complicity of European states that have shamefully continued to enable and assist Libyan coastguards in capturing people at sea and forcibly returning them to the hellscape of detention in Libya, despite knowing full well the horrors they will endure.”

On 11 October 2022, UN human rights reported that migrants in Libya were often compelled to accept ‘assisted return’ to their home countries in conditions that may not meet international human rights laws and standards. Additionally, the report finds that many migrants were returned to the same adverse drivers and structural conditions which compelled their movement in the first place, putting them in precarious and vulnerable situations upon their return. Such returns were unlikely to be sustainable from a human rights perspective.

Historical situation

The following table shows Libya's ratings since 1972 in the Freedom in the World reports, published annually by the US government-funded Freedom House. A score of 1 is "best"; 7 is "worst".

International treaties
Libya's stances on international human rights treaties are as follows:

See also

 Al-Gaddafi International Prize for Human Rights
 Detention Centres in Libya
 Health in Libya
 Human rights violations in the Libyan civil war
 Internet censorship in Libya
 LGBT rights in Libya
 Libyan Civil War
 Women in Libya

Notes 
1.Note that the "Year" signifies the year the report was issued. The information for the year marked 2009 covers the year 2008, and so on.
2.As of 1 January.
3.The 1982 report covers 1981 and the first half of 1982, and the following 1984 report covers the second half of 1982 and the whole of 1983. In the interest of simplicity, these two aberrant "year and a half" reports have been split into three-year-long reports through interpolation.

References

External links
 Amnesty International. LIBYAN ARAB JAMAHIRIYA.BRIEFING TO THE UN HUMAN RIGHTS COMMITTEE, 2007
 US Department of State.2008 Human Rights Report: Libya
 Library of Congress country study
 Censorship in Libya - IFEX
 2012 Annual Report, by Amnesty International
 Freedom in the World 2011 Report, by Freedom House
 World Report 2012, by Human Rights Watch

 
Government of Libya
Libya
Law of Libya
Society of Libya